Here Come the Munsters is a television film that aired on Fox October 31, 1995. It stars Edward Herrmann, Christine Taylor and Veronica Hamel. The film tells the story of the Munster family's arrival in the US from Transylvania. This is an adaptation/update to the main characters of the US TV series from the 1960s, The Munsters.

Plot
The Munster family is tired of being persecuted back in Transylvania, and on finding part of a letter from cousin Marilyn in California, decides to head to the United States. On arrival they find that Marilyn's father, Norman Hyde, is missing, and her mother (Herman's sister) Elsa Hyde is in a coma. Marilyn details this in the letter but Spot burned the mail (and the letter carrier) so this comes as a surprise to the Munsters.

The family must find out what has happened to Marilyn's father, and find a way to revive Elsa. They also have to try to live in new surroundings as they try to "fit in" in America.

It turns out that Norman was trying to find a way to make his "peaches and cream" daughter, Marilyn, look a little more like the rest of the clan, but somehow the experiment backfired and Norman Hyde became Brent Jekyll. (This is a take on The Strange Case of Dr. Jekyll and Mr. Hyde by Robert Louis Stevenson.)

Brent Jekyll is running for Congress. A plank of his campaign platform is trying to get foreigners out of America (this includes the Munsters). In a more sinister part of the story, it seems that Hyde was sabotaged and transformed into Jekyll purposely, to bring forward a politician without a past to whom people would listen.

As the story unfolds, the family tries to save the day. With Herman arrested and placed in jail, Grandpa creates a replica of him from spare parts and uses it to help him escape. They flee from the scene in the Munster Koach.

Cast

Main cast
Edward Herrmann as Herman Munster
Veronica Hamel as Lily Munster
Robert Morse as Grandpa
Christine Taylor as Marilyn Hyde
Mathew Botuchis as Eddie Munster

Guest cast

Troy Evans as Detective Warshowski
Joel Brooks as Larry Walker
Sean O'Bryan as Detective Cartwell
Mary Woronov as Mrs. Edna Dimwitty
Jeff Trachta as Brent Jekyll
Max Grodénchik as Norman Hyde
Judy Gold as Elsa Munster Hyde
Amanda Bearse as Mrs. Pearl
 Irwin Keyes as One-eyed man
 Jim Fisher as Villager
 Scotch Ellis Loring as Flight Attendant
 Brian George as Immigration Official
 Robertson Dean as Angry Dog Owner
 Jim Staahl as Quaranteen Official
 Keone Young as Ralph, the limo driver
 Kellen Hathaway as   Trick-or-Treater
 Bill Prady as Paramedic
 T.J. McInturff as Stanley
 Francesca Smith as Monique
 Jane Carr as Cassie O'Leary
 James Keane as Maitre d'
 James Basile as Waiter
 Lynne Marie Stewart as Mrs. Waffer
 Judy Kain as Mrs. Hersby
 Tommy Bertelsen as Ted Walker
 Ralph P. Martin as Sergeant
 Jim Jackman as Front Desk Officer
 Christina Venuti as Woman at Fundraiser
 Aaron Paris as Transformed Band Leader
 Dee Wallace as Mrs. Walker (uncredited)

Cameos
The four original Munsters surviving cast members - Yvonne De Carlo, Al Lewis, Butch Patrick and Pat Priest - appeared in a short cameo scene in an Italian restaurant as a bickering family, with Herman (Edward Herrmann) acting as their waiter. The original Herman from the TV series, Fred Gwynne, had died two years before.

Production

Writing
While the movie draws on many elements of the original series, it departs from the established "Munsters" canon. In this version Marilyn's last name is given as Hyde and she is the daughter of Herman's sister, not Lily's (as she is in the original series and in "The Munsters Today"). Also, in this film Marilyn is the same age as she is in the series, however Marilyn has said in the original series that Herman and Lily have raised her since she was a baby. In terms of the Munster's house, the ownership was changed. In the original series and "The Munsters Today", the Munsters owned the house but in this version they are just house-sitting for Herman's sister. Grandpa's lab is shown to be under the stairs (where "Spot" lived) instead of under a trap door in the living room as in the original series and in "The Munsters Today". Finally, in this version, Grandpa uses a spell to create The Munster Koach by transforming a hearse. This is in contradiction to the original series and "The Munsters Today" where Lily buys it as a gift for Herman.

See also
 Mockingbird Lane, a 2012 TV special originally intended as a pilot for a reimagined Munsters series.

References

External links

The Munsters films
American television films
1995 television films
1995 films
Fox network original films
Films produced by John Landis
1990s English-language films